2018 Canadian Ringette Championships was 40th edition of Canadian Ringette Championships. It was a national ringette tournament held from April 9 to April 14, 2018 at Winnipeg, Manitoba.

Stadium
Bell MTS Iceplex 
Seven Oaks Arena
Bell MTS Place

Champions
U16: Angles 
U19: Laurentides
NRL: Atlantic Attack

Results
c denotes the team clinches the consolation round

x denotes that team clinches first round (U16) or quarterfinal (U19)

y denotes that team clinches quarterfinal (U16)

U16

Round-robin
Pool A

Pool B

Pool C

Championship

Consolation

U19

Round-robin
Pool A

Pool B

Championship

Consolation

NRL

Mini game

U16

U19

Final

U16

U19

NRL

Final standing

U16
: Angels

: Calgary Surges

: Nepean Ravens

4: Regina Stingers

5: New Brunswick

6: Zone 2

7: Rive Sud

8: LMRL Thunder

9: Saskatoon Selects

10: Calgary Shock

11: PEI

12: Manitoba Magic

13: Mississauga Mustangs

14: Central Alberta Sting

15: BLL (QC)

16: Spruce Grove Pursuit (AB)

17: Central Whitby Sharks

18: Zone 5 Pack (AB)

19: Sherwood Park Power (AB)

20: Manitoba Wild

21: Eastman Flames (MB)

U19
: Laurentides

: Angels

: Eastman Flames

4: Waterloo Wildfire

5: Guelph Predators

6: Manitoba Magic

7: Team New Brunswick

8: BLL (QC)

9: Calgary Strive

10: Nova Scotia

11: Saskatchewan

12: Zone 5 GRIT (AB)

13: Mississauga Mustangs

14: LMRL Thunder

15: Edmonton Elite

16: TORL Force (BC)

17: St. Albert Mission

18: Wave

National Ringette League

2018 Canadian Ringette Championships, National Ringette League results:

: Atlantic Attack

: Edmonton WAM!

: Cambridge Turbos

4: Calgary RATH

5: Richmond Hill Lightning

6: Montreal Mission

7: Gatineau Fusion

8: Manitoba Intact

Awards and all-star team

Agnes Jacks True Sport awards
U16: Saskatoon Selects
U19: Eastman Flames 
NRL: Calgary RATH

Toughest Competitor Awards
U16: Keala Fleury (Saskatoon Selects)
U19: Trudy Beamish (Eastman Flames)
NRL: Chantal Gauthier (Richmond Hill Lighting)

1st all-star team

U16
Offence: Emma Kelly – Nepean Ravens
Offence: Alexsi Kavvadas – Angels
Offence: Alexane Dupuis – New Brunswick
Defence: Chanelle Smith – Calgary Surge
Defence: Reese Lange – Angels
Goalie: Georgia Fraser - PEI

U19
Offence: Alana Lesperance – Angels
Offence: Milica Oravec – Eastman Flames
Offence: Mégane Fortin – Laurentides
Defence: Nicole Pelletier – Edmonton Elite
Defence: Gabriele Lefebvre – Laurentides
Goalie: Marie Ève Dubé – Laurentides

NRL
Offence: Martine Caissie – Atlantic Attack
Offence: Jenny Snowdon – Atlantic Attack
Offence: Maude Charbonneau – Montreal Mission
Defence: Paige Nosal – Cambridge Turbos
Defence: Erica Voss – Richmond Hill Lightning
Goalie: Karine Doiron – Atlantic Attack

2nd all-star team

U16
Offence: Riley Wasylyniuk – Zone 2 Alberta
Offence: Brynn Nesbitt – Calgary Surge
Offence: Rileigh Hache – Nepean Ravens
Defence: Olivia Birstonas – Central Whitby Sharks
Defence: Grace Brown – Calgary Shock
Goalie: Julianna McIntyre – Angels

U19
Offence: Kaylee Spearing – Angels
Offence: Claire Wyville – Guelph Predators
Offence: Cloé LeBlanc – New Brunswick
Defence: Laurence St-Denis – Laurentides
Defence: Emilie Gruninger – Eastman Flames
Goalie: Janna Griffioen – Guelph Predators

NRL
Offence: Chantal St-Laurent – Gatineau Fusion
Offence: Kaitlyn Youldon – Gatineau Fusion
Offence: Justine Exner – Calgary RATH
Defence:  Julie Vandal – Gatineau Fusion
Defence: Lindsay Brown – Edmonton WAM!
Goalie: Breanna Beck – Edmonton WAM!

References

Canadian Ringette Championships
Ringette
Ringette competitions